The 12 Disasters of Christmas (released on home media as 12 Disasters) is a Canadian-American disaster television film produced for Syfy in 2012 and directed by Steven R. Monroe.

Plot
In a small town called Calvary, a rain of ice spears puts everyone on notice. Just before Jacey's (Magda Apanowicz) grandmother dies, she gives a mystical ring to her explaining that she is the chosen one to stop the end of the world prophesied by the Maya for December 21, 2012. Jacey was born right at Christmas, her parents are named Joseph (Ed Quinn) and Mary (Holly Elissa), and the solution is in the hidden message of the popular Christian holiday song "The 12 Days of Christmas", where a different disaster corresponds to each day  and the "five gold rings" provide a messianic gift.

Cast

Release
The 12 Disasters of Christmas first premiered on the Syfy network on December 8, 2012, at 9PM Eastern. It became Syfy's most watched television film on its premiere since February that year. The DVD version was released on January 6, 2014.

Reception
The film received negative ratings, but critics have noted that the film is entertaining despite its lack of quality. The New York Times stated that "the movie gets an F in most of the traditional critical categories. Dialogue? F. Coherence? F. But in terms of serving as a counterweight to the syrupy fare that clogs almost every other network at this time of year, this ridiculous mess earns an A+." The New York Daily News gave the film one star out of five, opining that "some bad movies just bore you, while others create a perverse fascination, an aura that keeps you watching in the hope they will never get better.
The Twelve Disasters of Christmas does not. It stays true to the path on which it embarked, seemingly never troubled for a second by concern for trivial matters like, oh, dialogue or plot." The A.V. Club gave the film a D rating stating "...comes closer to so-bad-it's-good territory than any SyFy Original Movie in recent memory."

See also
 List of Christmas films

References

External links
  at CineTel Films
  at Syfy Australia
 
 
 

2012 television films
2012 films
Syfy original films
American disaster films
Canadian disaster films
English-language Canadian films
Canadian science fiction television films
CineTel Films films
Disaster television films
Films directed by Steven R. Monroe
Films about impact events
Films set in 2012
2010s Christmas films
2010s English-language films
2010s Canadian films
2010s American films